Phyllonorycter rajella is a moth of the family Gracillariidae. It is known from all of Europe, except the Iberian Peninsula and Greece.

The wingspan is 7–9 mm. The forewings are fuscous or ochreous, in the female more whitish towards base; a pointed white median streak from base to middle, edged with dark fuscous above; four costal and three dorsal posterior shining white wedge-shaped spots, edged anteriorly and first costal posteriorly with dark fuscous, first dorsal broad, before first costal; a round black apical dot; an ill-defined dark hook in apical cilia. Hindwings are grey. The larva is greenish-white; dorsal line green; head pale brown 
 
There are two generations per year with adults on wing in May and again in August.

The larvae feed on Alnus cordata, Alnus glutinosa, Alnus incana, Alnus oregona and Alnus viridis, mining the leaves of their host plant. They create a lower-surface tentiform mine, usually in the axle of a thick lateral vein and there is one strong lengthwise fold. Pupation takes place in a tough off-white cocoon that is attached to the floor and the roof of the mine. Most frass is incorporated in the sides of the cocoon.

References

External links
 

rajella
Moths described in 1758
Moths of Europe
Taxa named by Carl Linnaeus